The World Highland Games Championships is a well-recognized event in both strength athletics and Highland Games. The championships were organized by David Webster, OBE of Scotland, who still conducts the World Championships. A roll of past competitors includes many of the World's greatest strength athletes with Olympic finalists, World Record Holders, Commonwealth Games medal winners, Guinness Book of Record entrants, physique champions, continental & national titleholders, World's Strongest Men and International legends in various sports. The World Highland Games Championships consist of traditional events and are in this sense differentiated from many of the other international strength athletic competitions, including the Highlander World Championships.

History 
The World Highland Games Championships were first held in 1980 and were created as an attempt to identify who was truly the greatest Highland Games competitor. Many of the Highland Games competitions around the world have traditionally not been invitational, in the sense that novices can step up to compete, or at the more established events, the competitors were very much more selected from the nation in which the competition was held. The world's introduced a formalization of the requirements for entry and a truly international flavor.

Over the years competitors have been drawn from the disciplines of field athletics, including the shot put, discus and hammer throw, as well as strength athletes and dedicated Highland Games specialists. In the first three decades of the competition there have been thirteen champions, with four men each having won the title five times, Geoff Capes, Jim McGoldrick, Ryan Vierra and Matt Sandford, and one of those, Geoff Capes, having also won the 1981 World Highland Games Championships held in Lagos, which would make him six times world champion, although this is not listed on the official website.

List of champions 
List information taken from this source.

Source of the above information: Official World Championship site of the IHGF.

Championships by country

Repeat champions

References 

Strongmen competitions
Highland games